Road Raider (retitled as Motor Massacre for the ZX Spectrum) is a 1988 video game published by Mindscape.

Gameplay
Road Raider is a game in which mad doctor Dr. A. Noid has turned most of humanity into zombies and mutants that crave a food substitute called Slu which he created.

Reception
Adam Sherwin reviewed the game for Computer Gaming World, and stated that "Road Raider has an interesting concept, an acceptable level of difficulty, and a tremendous graphics presentation. Everything, even the title screen, shows meticulous design and care."

Reviews
Atari ST User - Apr, 1989
Amiga Computing - May, 1989
Commodore User - Mar, 1989
Your Sinclair - Apr, 1989
Zzap! - Apr, 1989
Crash - Apr, 1989
VideoGames & Computer Entertainment #4	May 1989

References

1988 video games
Action video games
Amiga games
Amstrad CPC games
Atari ST games
Commodore 64 games
Mindscape games
Post-apocalyptic video games
Top-down video games
Video games developed in Canada
ZX Spectrum games